William Kamkwamba (born August 5, 1987) is a Malawian inventor, engineer, and author. He gained renown in his country in 2001 when he built a wind turbine to power multiple electrical appliances in his family's house in Wimbe, 23 km (14 mi) east of Kasungu, using blue gum trees, bicycle parts, and materials collected in a local scrapyard. Since then, he has built a solar-powered water pump that supplies the first drinking water in his village and two other wind turbines, the tallest standing at 12 meters (39 ft), and is planning two more, including one in Lilongwe, the political capital of Malawi.

Life and career
Kamkwamba was born in a family of relative poverty and relied primarily on farming to survive. William enjoyed playing with his friends using recycled materials. A crippling famine forced Kamkwamba to drop out of school, and he was not able to return to school because his family was unable to afford the tuition. In a desperate attempt to retain his education, Kamkwamba began to frequent the local school library; it was there that he discovered his love for electronics. Before, he had once set up a small business repairing his village's radios, but this work did not earn him much money.

Kamkwamba, after reading a book called Using Energy, decided to create a makeshift wind turbine. He experimented with a small model using a cheap dynamo and eventually made a functioning wind turbine that powered some electrical appliances in his family's house. Local farmers and journalists investigated the spinning device and Kamkwamba's fame in international news skyrocketed. A blog about his accomplishments was written on Hacktivate and Kamkwamba took part in the first event celebrating his particular type of ingenuity called Maker Faire Africa in Ghana in August 2009.

Fame

When The Daily Times in Blantyre, the commercial capital, wrote a story on Kamkwamba's wind turbine in November 2006, the story circulated through the blogosphere, and TED conference director Emeka Okafor invited Kamkwamba to talk at TEDGlobal 2007 in Arusha, Tanzania as a guest. His speech moved the audience, and several venture capitalists at the conference pledged to help finance his secondary education. His story was covered by Sarah Childress for The Wall Street Journal. He became a student at African Bible College Christian Academy in Lilongwe.  He then went on to receive a scholarship to the African Leadership Academy and in 2014 graduated from Dartmouth College in Hanover, New Hampshire.

Among other appearances, Kamkwamba was interviewed on The Daily Show on 7 October 2009 (during which he was playfully compared to the fictional hero Angus MacGyver for his impressive scientific ingenuity).  In addition, he was invited to and attended the 2011 Google Science Fair introductory meeting, where he was a guest speaker.

Kamkwamba's book, The Boy Who Harnessed the Wind, was selected as the 2013 "1 Book, 1 Community" title for Loudoun County, Virginia's Public Library system. "1book 1community is a countywide reading program that promotes community dialog and understanding through the shared experience of reading and discussing the same book." Copies of the book were purchased from the A.V. Symington and Irwin Uran Gift Funds.

Kamkwamba is the subject of the documentary film William and the Windmill, which won the Grand Jury Prize for Best Documentary Feature at the 2013 South By Southwest film festival in Austin, Texas.

In 2010, The Boy Who Harnessed the Wind was selected as the University of Florida and Boise State University common book, required for all incoming students to read.  In 2014, it was selected as the common book at Auburn University and University of Michigan College of Engineering, as well.  William made an appearance at each university to discuss his book and life.

In 2013 TIME magazine named Kamkwamba one of the "30 People Under 30 Changing The World".

Kamkwamba is featured in the book Extraordinary People by Michael Hearst and is also the subject of a song from the companion album Songs For Extraordinary People. 

In 2014, Kamkwamba received a Bachelor of Arts degree in Environmental Studies from Dartmouth College in Hanover, New Hampshire where he was elected to the Sphinx Senior Honor Society.

In 2019, The Boy Who Harnessed the Wind was adapted into a film, starring Chiwetel Ejiofor, who also wrote and directed.

References

External links

 William Kamkwamba's blog
 The Boy Who Harnessed the Wind : Creating Currents of Electricity and Hope
 Moving Windmills
 
 
 William Kamkwamba talks at MIT
 
 

.

1987 births
21st-century inventors
Autobiographers
Dartmouth College alumni
Innovation
Living people
Malawian engineers
Malawian expatriates in the United States
Malawian innovators
Malawian inventors
People from Kasungu District
Utility